Solihull is a constituency represented in the House of Commons of the UK Parliament since 2015 by Julian Knight. Although originally elected as a Conservative, Knight currently sits as an independent, having had the whip suspended following allegations of serious sexual assault made to the Metropolitan Police in December 2022.

Members of Parliament

Constituency profile
The Solihull area is home to some of the West Midlands's more affluent residents and includes a high proportion of Birmingham workers and the managerial classes in manufacturing, retail, industry and the public sector. There are smaller villages and undeveloped green belt areas in its peripheral countryside, though the seat is primarily suburban and middle-class, with low levels of deprivation throughout.  Workless claimants stood at only 2% of the population in November 2012, below every regional average in the UK.  In the study of that date, only three of the 59 West Midlands seats had a lower proportion of registered jobseekers.

Following boundary changes, the northernmost tip of the seat now contains the point in England furthest from the coast in any direction.

Boundaries

The constituency is one of two covering the Metropolitan Borough of Solihull.  It covers the town of Solihull itself, as well as Shirley and Olton.  It is a largely well-off, residential area, in the south-east of the West Midlands conurbation.

1945–1974: The Urban District of Solihull.

1974–1983: The County Borough of Solihull.

1983–present: The Metropolitan Borough of Solihull wards of Elmdon, Lyndon, Olton, St Alphege, Shirley East, Shirley South, Shirley West, and Silhill.

History
Conservative candidates won the seat from its outset in 1945 until a loss in 2005, the seat meanwhile seeing boundary changes covered above. In the 2005 general election Solihull was won by the Liberal Democrats, with Lorely Burt beating the incumbent John Taylor by a majority of 279 votes. Burt won the seat again at the 2010 general election, this time by just 175 votes following two recounts. 

The seat has been represented by Julian Knight since 2015, who won the seat from Burt with a majority of 12,902. At the 2017 election, Knight increased his majority to just over 20,000, with a similar result in 2019, making Solihull a safe Conservative seat. 

However, following allegations of serious sexual assault made to the Metropolitan Police against Knight in December 2022, Knight sits as an independent MP, having had the Conservative whip suspended.

Elections

Elections in the 2010s

 Due to Boundary Changes this seat was notionally Conservative, even though it was previously held by the Liberal Democrats, making it a Liberal Democrat gain.

Elections in the 2000s

Elections in the 1990s

Elections in the 1980s

Elections in the 1970s

Elections in the 1960s

Elections in the 1950s

Election in the 1940s

See also
 List of parliamentary constituencies in the West Midlands (county)

Notes

References

Parliamentary constituencies in the West Midlands (county)
Politics of Solihull
Constituencies of the Parliament of the United Kingdom established in 1945